Wang Su (born 15 March 1984) is a Chinese taekwondo practitioner. 

She won a gold medal in bantamweight at the 1999 World Taekwondo Championships in Edmonton, by defeating Jung Jae-eun in the final. She won a silver medal at the 2000 Asian Taekwondo Championships.

References

External links

1984 births
Living people
Chinese female taekwondo practitioners
World Taekwondo Championships medalists
Asian Taekwondo Championships medalists
21st-century Chinese women